The Brass era Reliance automobile was manufactured by the Reliance Automobile Manufacturing Company in Detroit, Michigan from 1904 to 1907.

History 
The Reliance was a two-cylinder, 3.2 liter water-cooled engine car with selective transmission and shaft-drive. It was designed by E. O. Abbott and W. K. Ackerman, both formerly with Cadillac.The body style was a side-entrance tonneau and the company wanted to advertise they were the first in the United States to introduce it, and pre-dated production to 1903 instead of 1904.  Peerless and Orlo both introduced a side-entrance body in 1904.

The Reliance had a King of Belgium tonneau body style for 1905 and was priced at $1,250, .  The company was under-capitalized and was reorganized in 1904 as Reliance Motor Car Company, with Fred O. Paige taking charge shortly after.   A commercial truck was added in 1906 and from February 1907 only trucks were manufactured.

Reliance sold the passenger car production and it would later become the Cresent automobile.  Reliance was purchased in 1909 by General Motors and the Reliance truck evolved into the first GMC truck.  Fred Paige departed to build his Paige automobile.

Advertisements

References

Defunct motor vehicle manufacturers of the United States
Motor vehicle manufacturers based in Michigan
Defunct manufacturing companies based in Detroit
Defunct truck manufacturers of the United States
Vehicle manufacturing companies established in 1904
Vehicle manufacturing companies disestablished in 1909
Veteran vehicles
Brass Era vehicles
1900s cars
Cars introduced in 1904